VinaCapital Vietnam Opportunity Fund is a large British investment trust dedicated to investments in capital markets, private equity, undervalued assets, privatised assets, property and private placements. It is managed by VinaCapital. After transferring from the Alternative Investment Market to a full listing in March 2016, the company went on to become a constituent of the FTSE 250 Index. The Chairman is Huw Evans. Andy Ho is the Managing Director.

As of December 31, 2021, VOF's net asset value was $1,404.3 million, with a market capitalization of $1,156.9 million.

Top Holdings

As of December 31, 2021, VOF's top listed equity holdings were:

References

External links
 Official site

Investment trusts of the United Kingdom